Irina Lashko (born 25 January 1973, in Samara) is a Russian diver who, after her marriage with an Australian, became known as Irina Furler.

Lashko competed in four Summer Olympics, and represented four countries: the Soviet Union (1988), Unified Team (1992), Russia (1996) and Australia (2004). She won a total number of three Olympic medals, two silver and one bronze. Lashko was affiliated with the Melam Diving Club.

References

External links
 

1973 births
Living people
Australian female divers
Soviet female divers
Russian female divers
Divers at the 1988 Summer Olympics
Olympic divers of the Soviet Union
Olympic divers of Russia
Olympic divers of Australia
Divers at the 1992 Summer Olympics
Divers at the 1996 Summer Olympics
Divers at the 2004 Summer Olympics
Divers at the 2002 Commonwealth Games
Olympic silver medalists for the Unified Team
Olympic silver medalists for Russia
Olympic bronze medalists for Australia
Commonwealth Games gold medallists for Australia
Sportspeople from Samara, Russia
Russian emigrants to Australia
Olympic medalists in diving
Medalists at the 2004 Summer Olympics
Medalists at the 1996 Summer Olympics
Medalists at the 1992 Summer Olympics
World Aquatics Championships medalists in diving
Commonwealth Games medallists in diving
Universiade medalists in diving
Universiade silver medalists for Russia
Medalists at the 1999 Summer Universiade
Medallists at the 2002 Commonwealth Games